Greg Allen Harris (born November 2, 1955) is an American former professional baseball pitcher, who played in Major League Baseball (MLB) for 15 years (–), Harris pitched in 703 career games, starting 98. He pitched for the San Diego Padres in the 1984 World Series, which they lost to the Detroit Tigers in five games.

Though he spent his career as a right-handed pitcher, Harris threw left-handed to two batters in a 1995 game (the penultimate game of his career), becoming the first switch pitcher to pitch in a Major League game in the modern era.

Harris also was unusual in that, for periods during 1991–93 pitching for the Boston Red Sox, he achieved success while throwing curve balls almost exclusively.

Early career
Greg attended Los Alamitos High School and then Long Beach City College. He was selected by the New York Mets in 7th round (130th overall) of the 1976 January Amateur Baseball Draft.

Switch pitcher
A natural right-hander, by 1986 Harris could throw well enough left-handed that he felt he could pitch with either hand in a game, but his team would not allow this, keeping him from being a legitimate ambidextrous major league pitcher.  Harris wasn't allowed to throw lefty in a regular season game until September 28, 1995, his penultimate game with the Montreal Expos. In the ninth inning, Harris retired Reggie Sanders pitching right-handed, then switched to his left hand for the next two hitters, Hal Morris and Ed Taubensee, who both batted lefty.  Harris walked Morris but got Taubensee to ground out.  He then went back to his right hand to retire Bret Boone to end the inning. Harris's glove, which was custom built with an extra thumb so that it could be worn on either hand, is now on display at the National Baseball Hall of Fame.

Personal life
His son, Greg Harris, Jr., was drafted by the Los Angeles Dodgers in the 17th round of the 2013 MLB Draft and was traded to the Tampa Bay Rays in November 2014.

During his career, Harris was often known as Greg A. Harris to differentiate him from fellow pitcher Greg W. Harris, whose career he overlapped.

See also
Pat Venditte, a major league pitcher who throws with either hand
Tony Mullane, a dead-ball-era pitcher who routinely switch-pitched

References

External links

Greg Harris at Ultimate Mets Database
Box score from Harris' ambidextrous game, Sept. 28, 1995

1955 births
Living people
American expatriate baseball players in Canada
Baseball players from California
Boston Red Sox players
Cincinnati Reds players
Indianapolis Indians players
Jackson Mets players
Lynchburg Mets players
Maine Phillies players
Major League Baseball pitchers
Montreal Expos players
New York Mets players
New York Yankees players
Ottawa Lynx players
Philadelphia Phillies players
San Diego Padres players
Texas Rangers players
Tidewater Tides players
Long Beach City Vikings baseball players
Alaska Goldpanners of Fairbanks players